The Powhatan people (also spelled Powatan) may refer to any of the Indigenous Algonquian people that are traditionally from eastern Virginia. All of the Powhatan groups descend from the Powhatan Confederacy. In some instances, The Powhatan may refer to one of the leaders of the people. This is most commonly the case in historical records from English colonial accounts. The Powhatans have also been known as Virginia Algonquians, as the Powhatan language is an eastern-Algonquian language, also known as Virginia Algonquian. It is estimated that there were about 14,000–21,000 Powhatan people in eastern Virginia, when English colonists established Jamestown in 1607.

In the late 16th and early 17th centuries, a mamanatowick (paramount chief) named Wahunsenacawh created an organization by affiliating 30 tributary peoples, whose territory was much of eastern Virginia. They called this area Tsenacommacah ("densely inhabited Land"). Wahunsenacawh came to be known by English  colonists as "The Powhatan (Chief)". Each of the tribes within this organization had its own weroance (leader, commander), but all paid tribute to The Powhatan (Chief).

After Wahunsenacawh's death in 1618, hostilities with colonists escalated under the chiefdom of his brother, Opchanacanough, who sought in vain to expel encroaching English colonists. His large-scale attacks in 1622 and 1644 met strong reprisals by the colonists, resulting in the near elimination of the tribe. By 1646, what is called the Powhatan Paramount Chiefdom by modern historians had been decimated. More important than the ongoing conflicts with the English colonial settlements was the high rate of deaths the Powhatan suffered due to new infectious diseases carried to North America by Europeans, such as measles and smallpox. The Native Americans did not have any immunity to these, which had been endemic to Europe and Asia for centuries. The wholesale deaths greatly weakened and hollowed out the Native American societies.

By the mid-17th century, the leaders of the colony were desperate for labor to develop the land. Almost half of the European immigrants to Virginia arrived as indentured servants. As settlement continued, the colonists imported growing numbers of enslaved Africans for labor. By 1700, the colonies had about 6,000 enslaved Africans, one-twelfth of the population. Enslaved people would at times escape and join the surrounding Powhatan. Some white indentured servants were also known to have fled and joined the Indigenous peoples. African slaves and indentured Europeans servants often worked and lived together, and while marriage was not always legal, some Native people lived, worked, and had children with them. After Bacon's Rebellion in 1676, the colony enslaved Indians for control. In 1691, the House of Burgesses abolished enslavement of Native peoples; however, many Powhatan were held in servitude well into the 18th century.

In the 21st century, eight Native tribes are officially recognized by Virginia as having ancestral ties to the Powhatan confederation. The Pamunkey and Mattaponi are the only two peoples who have retained reservation lands from the 17th century. The competing cultures of the Powhatan and English settlers were united through unions and marriages of members, the most well known of which was that of Pocahontas and John Rolfe. Their son Thomas Rolfe was the ancestor of many Virginians; many of the First Families of Virginia have both English and Virginia Algonquian ancestry.

Some survivors of the Powhatan confederacy have relocated elsewhere. Beginning in the late 19th century, individual people identifying collectively as the Powhatan Renape Nation settled a tiny subdivision known as Morrisville and Delair, in Pennsauken Township, New Jersey. Their ancestry is mostly from the Rappahannock tribe of Virginia and the related Nanticoke tribe of Delaware. They have been recognized as a tribe by the state of New Jersey.

Naming and terminology
The name "Powhatan" (also transcribed by Strachey as Paqwachowng) is the name of the Native American village or town of Wahunsenacawh. The title "Chief" or "King" Powhatan, used by English colonists, is believed to have been derived from the name of this site. Although the specific site of his home village is unknown, in modern times the Powhatan Hill neighborhood in the East End portion of the modern-day city of Richmond, Virginia is thought by many to be in the general vicinity of the original village. Tree Hill Farm, which is situated in nearby Henrico County a short distance to the east, is also considered as the possible site.

"Powhatan" was also the name used by the Natives to refer to the river where the town sat at the head of navigation. The English colonists chose to name it for their own leader, King James I. The English colonists named many features in the early years of the Virginia Colony in honor of the king, as well as for his three children, Elizabeth, Henry, and Charles.

Although portions of Virginia's longest river upstream from Columbia were much later named for Queen Anne of Great Britain, in modern times, it is called the James River. It forms at the confluence of the Jackson and Cowpasture rivers near the present-day town of Clifton Forge, flowing east to Hampton Roads. (The Rivanna River, a tributary of the James River, and Fluvanna County, were named in reference to Queen Anne). The only water body in Virginia to retain a name related to the Powhatan peoples is Powhatan Creek, located in James City County near Williamsburg.

Powhatan County and its county seat at Powhatan, Virginia were honorific names established years later, in locations west of the area populated by the Powhatan peoples. The county was formed in March 1777.

History

Complex paramount chiefdom
Various tribes each held some individual powers locally, and each had a chief known as a weroance (male) or, more rarely, a weroansqua (female), meaning "commander".

As early as the era of John Smith, the individual tribes of this grouping were clearly recognized by English colonists as falling under the greater authority of the centralized power led by the chiefdom of Powhatan (c. June 17, 1545 – c. 1618), whose proper name was Wahunsenacawh or (in 17th century English spelling) Wahunsunacock.

In 1607, when the first English colonial settlement in North America was founded at Jamestown, he ruled primarily from Werowocomoco, which was located on the northern shore of the York River. This site of Werowocomoco was rediscovered in the early 21st century; it was central to the tribes of the confederacy. The improvements discovered at the site during archaeological research have confirmed that Powhatan had a paramount chiefdom over the other tribes in the power hierarchy. Anthropologist Robert L. Carneiro in his The Chiefdom: Precursor of the State. The Transition to Statehood in the New World (1981), deeply explores the political structure of the chiefdom and confederacy.

Powhatan (and his several successors) ruled what is called a complex chiefdom, referred to by scholars as the Powhatan Paramount Chiefdom. Research work continues at Werowocomoco and elsewhere that deepens understanding of the Powhatan world.

Powhatan builds his chiefdom
Wahunsenacawh had inherited control over six tribes, but dominated more than thirty by 1607, when the English settlers established their Virginia Colony at Jamestown. The original six tribes under Wahunsenacawh were: the Powhatan (proper), the Arrohateck, the Appamattuck, the Pamunkey, the Mattaponi, and the Chiskiack.

He added the Kecoughtan to his fold by 1598. Some other affiliated groups included the Rappahannocks, Moraughtacund, Weyanoak, Paspahegh, Quiyoughcohannock, Warraskoyack, and Nansemond. Another closely related tribe of the same language group was the Chickahominy, but they managed to preserve their autonomy from the Powhatan Paramount Chiefdom. The Accawmacke, located on the Eastern Shore across the Chesapeake Bay, were nominally tributary to the Powhatan Chiefdom, but enjoyed autonomy under their own Paramount Chief or "Emperor", Debedeavon (aka "The Laughing King"). There were half a million Native Americans living within the Allegheny Mountains around the year 1600. 30,000 of those 500,000 lived in the Chesapeake region under Powhatan’s rule, by 1677 only five percent of his population remained. The huge jump in deaths were caused by exposure and contact with Europeans.

Later scholars estimated the total population of the paramountcy as 15,000.

English settlers in the land of the Powhatan

The Powhatan Confederacy was where English colonists established their first permanent settlement in North America. Conflicts began immediately between the Powhatan people and English colonists; the colonists fired shots as soon as they arrived (due to a bad experience they had with the Spanish prior to their arrival). Within two weeks of the arrival of English colonists at Jamestown, deaths had occurred.

The settlers had hoped for friendly relations and had planned to trade with the Virginia Indians for food. Captain Christopher Newport led the first colonial exploration party up the James River in 1607, when he met Parahunt, weroance of the Powhatan proper. English colonists initially mistook him for the paramount Powhatan (mamanatowick), his father Wahunsenacawh, who ruled the confederacy. Settlers coming into the region needed to befriend as many Native Americans as possible due to the unfamiliarity with the land. Not too long after settling down, they had realized the huge potential for tobacco. In order to grow more and more tobacco, they had to impede on Native territory. There were immediate issues result in 14 years of warfare.

On a hunting and trade mission on the Chickahominy River in December 1607, Captain John Smith wrote that he fought a small battle between the Opechancanough, and during this battle he tied his Indigenous guide to his body and used him as a human shield. Although Smith was wounded in the leg, and also had many arrows in his clothing he was not deathly injured, soon after he was captured by the Opechancanough. After Smith was captured the Natives had him ready for execution until he gave them a compass which they saw as a sign of friendliness so they did not kill him, instead took him to a more popular chief, followed by a ceremony. Smith first was introduced to Powhatan's brother, which was a chief under Powhatan to run a smaller portion of the tribe. Later Smith was introduced to Powhatan himself. was captured by Opechancanough, the younger brother of Wahunsenacawh. Smith became the first English colonist to meet the paramount chief Powhatan. According to Smith's account, Pocahontas, Chief Powhatan's daughter, prevented her father from executing Smith.

Some researchers have asserted that a mock execution of Smith was a ritual intended to adopt Smith into the tribe, but other modern writers dispute this interpretation, noting that many of Smith's stories do not line up with the known facts. They point out that nothing is known of 17th-century Powhatan adoption ceremonies and that an execution ritual is different from known rites of passage. Other historians, such as Helen Rountree, have questioned whether there was any risk of execution. They note that Smith failed to mention it in his 1608 and 1612 accounts, and only added it to his 1624 memoir, after Pocahontas had become famous.

In 1608, Captain Newport realized that Powhatan's friendship was crucial to the survival of the small Jamestown colony. In the summer of that year, he tried to "crown" the paramount Chief, with a ceremonial crown, to transform him into a "vassal". They also gave Powhatan many European gifts, such as a pitcher, feather mattress, bed frame, and clothes. The coronation went badly because they asked Powhatan to kneel to receive the crown, which he refused to do. As a powerful leader, Powhatan followed two rules: "he who keeps his head higher than others ranks higher," and "he who puts other people in a vulnerable position, without altering his own stance, ranks higher." To finish the "coronation", several English colonists had to lean on Powhatan's shoulders to get him low enough to place the crown on his head, as he was a tall man. Afterwards, the English colonists might have thought that Powhatan had submitted to King James, whereas Powhatan likely thought nothing of the sort.

After John Smith became president of the colony, he sent a force under Captain Martin to occupy an island in Nansemond territory and drive the inhabitants away. At the same time, he sent another force with Francis West to build a fort at the James River falls. He purchased the nearby fortified Powhatan village (present site of Richmond, Virginia) from Parahunt for some copper and an English colonist named Henry Spelman, who wrote a rare firsthand account of the Powhatan ways of life. Smith then renamed the village "Nonsuch", and tried to get West's men to live in it. Both these attempts at settling beyond Jamestown soon failed, due to Powhatan resistance. Smith left Virginia for England in October 1609, never to return, because of an injury sustained in a gunpowder accident. Soon afterward, English colonists established a second fort, Fort Algernon, in Kecoughtan territory.

Anglo-Powhatan Wars and treaties

In November 1609, Captain John Ratcliffe was invited to Orapakes, Powhatan's new capital. After he had sailed up the Pamunkey River to trade there, a fight broke out between the colonists and the Powhatan. All of the English colonists ashore were killed, including Ratcliffe, who was tortured by the women of the tribe. Those aboard the pinnace escaped and told the tale at Jamestown.

During that next year, the tribe attacked and killed many Jamestown residents. The residents fought back, but only killed twenty. However, arrival at Jamestown of a new Governor, Thomas West, 3rd Baron De La Warr, (Lord Delaware) in June 1610 signalled the beginning of the First Anglo-Powhatan War. A brief period of peace came only after the capture of Pocahontas, her baptism, and her marriage to tobacco planter John Rolfe in 1614. Within a few years both Powhatan and Pocahontas were dead. Powhatan died in Virginia, but Pocahontas died while in England. Meanwhile, the English settlers continued to encroach on Powhatan territory.

After Wahunsenacawh's death, his younger brother, Opitchapam, briefly became chief, followed by their younger brother Opechancanough.  The Powhatans were frightened by the influx of immigrants, the expansion of new villages on traditional farming lands, the subsequent need to purchase food from the settlers, and the enforced placement of Indian youth in "colleges."  In March 1622, they attacked the Jamestown plantations killing hundreds. The settlers quickly sought retaliation, killing hundreds of tribesmen and their families, burning fields, and spreading smallpox.  In 1644 the Powhatans again attacked English colonial settlements to force them from Powhatan territories, which was again met with strong reprisals from the colonists, ultimately resulting in the near destruction of the tribe. The Second Anglo–Powhatan War that followed the 1644 incident ended in 1646, after Royal Governor of Virginia William Berkeley's forces captured Opechancanough, thought to be between 90 and 100 years old. While a prisoner, Opechancanough was killed, shot in the back by a soldier assigned to guard him. He was succeeded as Weroance by Necotowance, and later by Totopotomoi and by his daughter Cockacoeske.

The Treaty of 1646 marked the effective dissolution of the united confederacy, as white colonists were granted an exclusive enclave between the York and Blackwater Rivers. This physically separated the Nansemonds, Weyanokes and Appomattox, who retreated southward, from the other Powhatan tribes then occupying the Middle Peninsula and Northern Neck. While the southern frontier demarcated in 1646 was respected for the remainder of the 17th century, the House of Burgesses lifted the northern one on September 1, 1649. Waves of new immigrants quickly flooded the peninsular region, then known as Chickacoan, and restricted the dwindling tribes to lesser tracts of land that became some of the earliest Indian reservations.

In 1665, the House of Burgesses passed stringent laws requiring the Powhatan to accept chiefs appointed by the governor. After the Treaty of Albany in 1684, the Powhatan Confederacy all but vanished.

Changing society and English expansion 
Educational programs established through the creation of the Indian School at the College of William and Mary in 1691 were a driving force behind cultural change. The College provided Powhatan boys with skills considered to be of little use by their people, however, literacy was generally viewed as a benefit of this Western education, and Powhatan boys who had received education at William and Mary sent their sons to the school. Increasing marriage of Powhatans to non-Indigenous people in the 17th century is also believed to have contributed to cultural change.

The Powhatans had begun gambling, smoking tobacco, and consuming alcohol recreationally by the end of the 17th century.

Characteristics

The Powhatan lived east of the Fall Line in Tidewater Virginia. They built their houses, called yehakins, by bending saplings and placing woven mats or bark over top of the saplings.  They supported themselves primarily by growing crops, especially maize, but they also fished and hunted in the great forest in their area. Villages consisted of a number of related families organized in tribes led by a chief (weroance/werowance or weroansqua if female). They paid tribute to the paramount chief (mamanatowick), Powhatan.

The region occupied by the Powhatan was bounded approximately by the Potomac River to the north, the Fall Line to the west, the Virginia-North Carolina border to the south, and the Atlantic Ocean to the east. Generally peaceful interactions with the Pamlicos and Chowanocs occurred along the southern boundary, while the western and northern boundaries were more contested. Conflicts occurred with Monacans and Mannahoacs along the western boundary and Massawomecks along the northern boundary.

The Powhatan primarily used fires to heat their sleeping rooms. As a result, less bedding was needed, and bedding materials could be easily stored during daytime hours. Couples typically slept head to foot.

According to research by the National Park Service, Powhatan "men were warriors and hunters, while women were gardeners and gatherers. English colonial accounts described the men, who ran and walked extensively through the woods in pursuit of enemies or game, as tall and lean and possessed of handsome physiques. The women were shorter, and were strong because of the hours they spent tending crops, pounding corn into meal, gathering nuts, and performing other domestic chores. When the men undertook extended hunts, the women went ahead of them to construct hunting camps. The Powhatan domestic economy depended on the labor of both sexes." Powhatan women would form work parties in order to accomplish tasks more efficiently. Women were also believed to serve as barbers, decorate homes, and produce decorative clothing. Overall, Powhatan women maintained a significant measure of autonomy in both their work lives and sexual lives. After a long day, the Powhatan people would celebrate and burn off any last energy they had by dancing and singing. This also allowed them to release any tensions they had from working with others.

All of Virginia's Native peoples practiced agriculture. They periodically moved their villages from site to site. Villagers cleared the fields by felling, girdling, or firing trees at the base and then using fire to reduce the slash and stumps. A village became unusable as soil productivity gradually declined and local fish and game were depleted. The inhabitants then moved on to allow the depleted area to revitalize, the soil to replenish, the foliage to grow and the number of fish and game to increase. With every change in location, the people used fire to clear new land. They left more cleared land behind. Native people also used fire to maintain extensive areas of open game habitat throughout the East, later called "barrens" by European colonists. The Powhatan also had rich fishing grounds. Bison had migrated to this area by the early 15th century.

It is believed that Powhatans would make offerings and pray to the sun during sunrises. Although, they also prayed and made offerings to specific Gods, who were believed to be in control of the harvest.  They used the land differently, and their religion was a Native one. Significantly, one of the major duties of Powhatan priests was controlling the weather.

Tribes of the paramount chiefdom and their territories 

The number of tribes listed and the number of warriors are based on estimates or reports which mostly go back to Captain John Smith (1580 - 1631) and William Strachey(1572 - 1621). Usually only the number of the warriors of the individual tribes is known, the stem number will therefore be determined with a ratio of 1: 3, 1: 3,3 or last 1: 4, the studies of Christian Feest are decisive. The last-mentioned figures refer to the first mention as well as the last mention of the respective tribes - e.g. 1585/1627 for the Chesapeake (Source: Handbook of North American Indians).

The Powhatan people today

State and federal recognition

As of 2014, the state of Virginia has recognized eight Powhatan Indian-descended tribes in Virginia. Collectively, the tribes currently have 3,000–3,500 enrolled tribal members. It is estimated, however, that 3 to 4 times that number are eligible for tribal membership. Two of these tribes, the Mattaponi and Pamunkey, still retain their reservations from the 17th century and are located in King William County, Virginia.

Since the 1990s, the Powhatan Indian tribes, which have state recognition, along with other Virginia Indian tribes which have state recognition, have been seeking federal recognition. That recognition process has proved difficult as it has been hampered by the lack of official records to verify heritage and by the historical misclassification of family members in the 1930s and 1940s, largely a result of Virginia's state policy of race classification on official documents.

After Virginia passed stringent racial segregation laws in the early 20th century, and ultimately the Racial Integrity Act of 1924 which mandated every person who had any African heritage be deemed "Black", Walter Plecker, the head of Vital Statistics office, directed all state and local registration offices to use only the terms "white" or "colored" to denote race on official documents. This eliminated all traceable records of Virginia Indians. All state documents, including birth certificates, death certificates, marriage licenses, tax forms and land deeds, thus bear no record of Virginia Indians. Plecker oversaw the Vital Statistics office in the state for more than 30 years, beginning in the early 20th century, and took a personal interest in eliminating traces of Virginia Indians. Plecker surmised that there were no true Virginia Indians remaining as years of intermarriage had "diluted the race". Over his years of service, he conducted a campaign to reclassify all bi-racial and multi-racial individuals as Black, believing such persons were fraudulently attempting to claim their race to be Indian or white. The effect of his reclassification has been described by tribal members as "paper genocide".

After the United States entered WWII many Powhatans volunteered to serve in the military. Powhatan men fought to be regarded separately from the Black community by the Selective Service. In 1954, Powhatans were given partial legal recognition by the General Assembly through a law stating that people with one-fourth or more Indian ancestry and one-sixteenth or less African ancestry were to be recognized as tribal Indians.

Initially, the Virginia tribes' efforts to gain federal recognition encountered resistance due to federal legislators' concerns over whether gambling would be established on their lands if recognition were granted. Casinos are illegal in Virginia and concerns were expressed about tax effects. In March 2009, five of the state-recognized Powhatan Indian tribes and the other state-recognized Virginia Indian tribe introduced a bill to gain federal recognition through an act of Congress. The bill, "The Thomasina E. Jordan Indian Tribes of Virginia Federal Recognition Act", included a section forbidding the tribes from opening casinos, even if casinos became legal in Virginia. The House Committee on Natural Resources recommended the bill be considered by the US House of Representatives at the end of April, and the House approved the bill on June 3, 2009. The bill was sent to the Senate's Committee on Indian Affairs, who recommended it be heard by the Senate as a whole in October. On December 23, 2009, the bill was placed on the Senate Legislative Calendar under general orders, which is where the bill is currently. The bill had a hold on it placed for "jurisdictional concerns", as Senator Tom Coburn (R-Ok) believes requests for tribal recognition should be processed through the Bureau of Indian Affairs. The Virginia tribes say that the disrupted record keeping under the racially discriminatory practices of Walter Plecker destroyed their ability to demonstrate historical continuity of identity. The bill died in the Senate.

In February 2011, the six Virginia tribes started the process again to try to gain federal recognition. They introduced a bill in the US House of Representatives and a companion bill in the Senate on the same day. On January 29, 2018, President Donald J. Trump signed the Thomasina E. Jordan Indian Tribes of Virginia Federal Recognition Act of 2017 into law, according federal recognition to the Chickahominy, Eastern Chickahominy, Upper Mattaponi, Rappahannock, Monacan and Nansemond tribes.

Powhatan languages

The tribes of the Powhatan confederacy shared mutually intelligible Algonquian languages. The most common was likely Powhatan. Its use became dormant due to the widespread deaths and social disruption suffered by the peoples. Much of the vocabulary bank is forgotten. Attempts have been made to reconstruct the vocabulary of the language using sources such as word lists provided by Smith and by the 17th-century writer William Strachey.

Powhatan in film
The Powhatan people are featured in MGM's live action film Captain John Smith and Pocahontas (1953) and the Disney animated musical film Pocahontas (1995). They also appeared in the straight-to-video sequel Pocahontas II: Journey to a New World (1998). Some of the current members of Powhatan-descended tribes complained about the Disney film. Roy Crazy Horse of the Powhatan Renape Nation said the Disney movie "distorts history beyond recognition".

An attempt at a more historically accurate representation was the drama The New World (2005), directed by Terrence Malick, which had actors speaking a reconstructed Powhatan language devised by the linguist Blair Rudes. The Powhatan people generally criticize the film for continuing the myth of a romance between Pocahontas and John Smith. Her actual husband was John Rolfe, whom she married on April 5, 1614.

Notable descendants

The Powhatan tribe's notable descendants include Edith Bolling Galt Wilson, wife of Woodrow Wilson, and actor Edward Norton.

See also
 Indigenous peoples of the Southeastern Woodlands
 Black Indians in the United States
 Native Americans in the United States
 Tribe (Native American)
 One-drop rule
 Patawomeck 
 Powhatan language
 Tsenacommacah

Notes

Further reading

 Sakas, Karliana. "The indigenous authorship of the narratives of the Spanish Jesuit mission of Ajacan (1570-1572)." EHumanista, vol. 19, 2011, p. 511+. Gale Academic Onefile, Accessed 14 Nov. 2019.
 Gleach, Frederic W. (1997) Powhatan's World and Colonial Virginia: A Conflict of Cultures. Lincoln: University of Nebraska Press.
 Gleach, Frederic W. (2006) "Pocahontas: An Exercise in Mythmaking and Marketing", In New Perspectives on Native North America: Cultures, Histories, and Representations, ed. by Sergei A. Kan and Pauline Turner Strong, pp. 433–455. Lincoln: University of Nebraska Press.
 Karen Kupperman, Settling With the Indians: The Meeting of English and Indian Cultures in America, 1580–1640, 1980
 A. Bryant Nichols Jr., Captain Christopher Newport: Admiral of Virginia, Sea Venture, 2007
 James Rice, Nature and History in the Potomac Country: From Hunter-Gatherers to the Age of Jefferson, 2009.
 Helen C. Rountree, Pocahontas's People: The Powhatan Indians of Virginia Through Four Centuries, 1990

External links

 The Anglo-Powhatan Wars
 Powhatan Renape Nation — Rankokus American Indian Reservation
 A Study of Virginia Indians and Jamestown: The First Century
 American in 1607 – National Geographic Magazine Jamestown/Werowocomoco Interactive
 UNC Charlotte linguist Blair Rudes restores lost language, culture for 'The New World'
 How a linguist revived 'New World' language
 The Indigenous Maps and Mapping of North American Indians

Algonquian peoples
Eastern Algonquian languages
Extinct languages of North America
Native American tribes in Virginia
Native American tribes in Maryland
Native American tribes in New Jersey
Indigenous languages of the North American eastern woodlands
 
History of Virginia
Algonquian ethnonyms